Coryphaenoides leptolepis, the ghostly grenadier, is a species of rattail found in the northern Atlantic and Pacific Oceans at depths of .  This species grows to a length of  TL.

References

R. A. Campbell, R. L. Haedrich, and T. A. Munroe1, Parasitism and ecological relationships among deep-sea benthic fishes, Marine Biology, Volume 57, Number 4 (1980).

Macrouridae
Fish described in 1877
Taxa named by Albert Günther